"Come Get Her" is a song by American hip hop duo Rae Sremmurd. It was released on September 29, 2015, by EarDrummers and Interscope Records, as the fifth single from their debut album SremmLife. The song was produced by EarDrummers-founder, Mike Will Made It. The music video for the song was released on September 21, 2015.

Music video
The music video was released on September 21, 2015. The video revolves around Rae Sremmurd being accidentally booked to perform at a country-music line-dancing club. It was filmed at the Cowboy Palace saloon in LA.

Personnel
Credits adapted from SremmLife booklet.

Song credits

Writing – Aaquil Brown, Khalif Brown, Michael Williams II, Marquel Middlebrooks
Production – Mike Will Made It
Co-production – A+
Recording – Stephen Hybicki at Windmark Studios in Santa Monica, California and Cody Seal at Larrabee Sound Studios in North Hollywood, California
Audio mixing – Jaycen Joshua and Mike Will Made It at Larrabee Sound Studios in North Hollywood, California
Assistant mix engineering – Maddox Chhim and Ryand Kaul
Mastering – Dave Kutch, The Mastering Palace, New York City

Charts

Certifications

References

External links

2014 songs
2015 singles
Rae Sremmurd songs
Interscope Records singles
Songs written by Swae Lee
Song recordings produced by Mike Will Made It
Songs written by Mike Will Made It
Songs written by Slim Jxmmi